Our Lady of Lourdes School may refer to several schools:

 Canada
Our Lady of Lourdes Catholic High School (Guelph, Ontario)

 United Kingdom
Our Lady of Lourdes High School, Ballymoney, County Antrim, Northern Ireland
Our Lady of Lourdes School, Arnos Grove, Enfield, London, England

 United States
Our Lady of Lourdes Academy, Miami, Florida
Our Lady of Lourdes Catholic School (Bethesda, Maryland)
Our Lady of Lourdes High School, Poughkeepsie, New York
Our Lady of Lourdes Regional High School, Northumberland County, Pennsylvania
Our Lady of Lourdes School, Louisville, Kentucky, see List of schools of the Roman Catholic Archdiocese of Louisville
Our Lady of Lourdes Catholic School (Salt Lake City, Utah)
Our Lady of Lourdes Elementary School, near Porcupine, South Dakota, a part of Red Cloud Indian School.